The 2019 Escuintla mayoral election will be held on 16 June 2019.

The elections will be held next to the presidential, legislative, municipal and Central American Parliament elections.

The current mayor Abraham Rivera Estévez, elected by the extinct Renewed Democratic Liberty, is running for re-election with Victoria party. Victoria has been criticized for being considered an "electoral vehicle" used by the Rivera family.

Results

References

Elections in Guatemala